Allensville may refer to:

Places
Canada
Allensville, Ontario

United States
Allensville, Indiana
Allensville, Kentucky
Allensville, Ohio
Allensville, Pennsylvania
Allensville, West Virginia
East Enterprise, Indiana

See also
Allenville (disambiguation)